Megan Dorman (born 1977) is an Irish-born Australian actress who is best known for her role as Katherine Ingram in the series, Head Start. She had a small role in Queen of the Damned, playing Maudy, one of Lestat's band members. Dorman also features in the video for Puretone's Addicted to Bass single from 2001.
Megan also played the role of Meg alongside fellow Aussie actress Leeanna Walsman in the mini-series Jessica, based on the novel by Bryce Courtenay.

References

1977 births
Australian soap opera actresses
Irish emigrants to Australia
Living people